Selden is a surname.

People
Anjelica Selden, an American softballer
Annie Selden, expert in mathematics education
Armistead I. Selden (1921–1985), American politician
Brian Selden, winner of the 1998 Magic: The Gathering World Championship
Catherine Selden, Gothic novelist of the early 19th century
David Selden (1914–1998), American activist
Dixie Selden (1868-1935) American Artist
Dudley Selden, member of U.S. House of Representatives from New York 
George Selden (author) (1929–1989), American author
George B. Selden (1846–1922), American inventor
Henry R. Selden (1805–1885), New York Lt. Gov. 1857-1858
John Selden (1584–1654), English jurist and scholar
Samuel L. Selden (1800-1876), Chief Judge of the New York Court of Appeals 1862
Wayne Selden Jr. (1994-present), American basketball player in the Israeli Basketball Premier League
William Selden (1831-1850), U.S. Treasurer, who served under six presidents

Fictional characters
Lawrence Selden, a character in Edith Wharton's novel, The House of Mirth